This is a list of butterflies of Great Britain, including extinct, naturalised species and those of dubious origin. The list comprises butterfly species listed in The Moths and Butterflies of Great Britain and Ireland by Emmet et al. and Britain's Butterflies by Tomlinson and Still.

A study by NERC in 2004 found there has been a species decline of 71% of butterfly species between 1983 and 2003. The 2007 UK Biodiversity Action Plan (BAP) listed 22 butterfly species. The 2011 Red List of British butterflies lists 4 species as "regionally extinct" (RE), 2 as "critically endangered", 8 as "endangered (E), 9 as "vulnerable" (V), 11 as "near threatened" (NT) and 28 as "least concern" (LC) in a UK context. In the list below, the categories are as taken from the 2022 Red List (RE 4, E 8, V 16, NT 5, LC 29). Range expansions according to the 2010 Atlas of Butterflies in Britain and Ireland.

Butterfly Conservation lists 29 of Great Britain's 58 breeding butterfly species as "High UK threat priority", with 9 of those with conservation priority status "Action urgent across UK range".

Hesperiidae – skippers

Subfamily Heteropterinae
Chequered skipper – Carterocephalus palaemon LC
– formerly thinly distributed in south and east, now confined to western Scotland; re-establishment project ongoing (2018–2020) Rockingham Forest, England
Subfamily Hesperiinae
Small skipper – Thymelicus sylvestris LC
– throughout Wales and England, except far north-east and north-west; spreading north and west
Essex skipper – Thymelicus lineola LC
– throughout south-east England, with scattered populations in West Country and as far north as the River Humber; spreading north and west
Lulworth skipper – Thymelicus acteon NT
– confined to the south coast between Weymouth and Swanage
Silver-spotted skipper – Hesperia comma V
– restricted to southern England: east Kent, east Sussex, Surrey, Hampshire, north Dorset, south Wiltshire and the southern Chilterns; expanding distribution
Large skipper – Ochlodes sylvanus LC
– throughout England and Wales, and north to south-west Scotland
Subfamily Pyrginae
Dingy skipper – Erynnis tages tages LC
– thinly distributed through much of England and Wales, and in the Scottish Highlands
Grizzled skipper – Pyrgus malvae V
– southern England north to north-east Wales, and south-east Wales

Papilionidae – swallowtails

Subfamily Papilioninae
Swallowtail – Papilio machaon V
 P. machaon britannicus (endemic subspecies) – confined to Norfolk Broads (formerly also in The Fens)
 P. machaon gorganus – rare migrant and occasional breeder from Continental Europe to southern England and southern Wales

Pieridae – whites and yellows

Subfamily Dismorphiinae
Wood white – Leptidea sinapis sinapis E
– Devon and west Somerset; Surrey; Buckinghamshire and Northamptonshire; and Worcestershire and Herefordshire

Subfamily Coliadinae
Dark clouded yellow – Colias croceus LC
– immigrant, though overwintering in south-west; north to River Clyde in some years
Common brimstone – Gonepteryx rhamni rhamni LC

– throughout England (except north) and Wales (except south-west, central west and far north-west); expanding range north and "infilling"

Subfamily Pierinae
Large white – Pieris brassicae LC
– throughout, but thinly spread in north-west half of Scotland
Small white – Pieris (Artogeia) rapae LC
– throughout, except far north
Green-veined white – Pieris (Artogeia) napi LC
 P. napi sabellicae – throughout (except for area occupied by subspecies thomsoni)
 P. napi thomsoni – east-central Scotland
Orange tip – Anthocharis cardamines britannica LC
– throughout, except far north and north-west; expanding range in Scotland and "infilling" in England and Wales

Lycaenidae – hairstreaks, coppers and blues

Subfamily Theclinae
Green hairstreak – Callophrys rubi LC
– throughout much of country
Brown hairstreak – Thecla betulae V
– south of River Humber, with concentrations in south-west Wales, north Devon and south-west Somerset, and west Weald. In 2009 eggs were found at Feckenham Wylde Moor reserve in Worcestershire.
Purple hairstreak – Neozephyrus (Quercusia) quercus LC
– throughout most of England and Wales, more thinly distributed north to River Clyde
White-letter hairstreak – Satyrium (Strymonidia) w-album V
– throughout much of England (except far south-west and north-west) and eastern Wales
Black hairstreak – Satyrium (Strymonidia) pruni E
– confined to heavy clay soils along Chiltern hills

Subfamily Lycaena
Small copper – Lycaena phlaeas eleus LC
– throughout, except far north and north-west

Subfamily Polyommatinae
Small blue – Cupido minimus NT
– southern and south-central England, south Wales coast, and east coast of Scotland (patchy distribution)
Silver-studded blue – Plebejus argus V
 P. argus argus – south-west and south England, East Anglia coast, and north Wales and north-east Wales borders
 P. argus cretaceus – formerly on chalk and limestone downland of south and south-east coasts, now restricted to Portland Bill
 P. argus caernensis – Great Ormes Head (north Wales)
 P. argus masseyi – extinct (formerly north-west England)
Brown argus – Aricia agestis LC
– throughout southern England, north to River Tees, south and north coasts of Wales; expanding range north
– evidence of hybridization with A. artaxerxes salmacis across northern England and Wales
Northern brown argus – Aricia artaxerxes V
 A. artaxerxes salmacis (Castle Eden argus) – England from north Lancashire north 
– evidence of hybridization with A. agestis across northern England and Wales
 A. artaxerxes artaxerxes – Scotland
Common blue – Polyommatus icarus icarus LC
– throughout
Chalkhill blue – Lysandra coridon V
– southern England
Adonis blue – Lysandra bellargus V
– south England; expanding range north and west
Holly blue – Celastrina argiolus britanna LC
– north to Solway Firth and River Tyne; expanding range north
Large blue – Phengaris arion NT
 P. arion eutyphron (endemic subspecies) – extinct
 P. arion arion – introduced to various sites in west England

Riodinidae – metalmarks

Duke of Burgundy – Hamearis lucina V
– central-south England; "pockets" in north-east, north-west and south-east England

Nymphalidae – fritillaries, nymphalids and browns

Subfamily Heliconiinae

Small pearl-bordered fritillary – Boloria (Clossiana) selene V
 B. selene selene – widespread in Wales, Scotland, southern and northern England
 B. selene insularum – western Scotland and Inner Hebrides
Pearl-bordered fritillary – Boloria (Clossiana) euphrosyne V
– patchily distributed through southern England, Wales, north-west and north-east England, and Scotland
High brown fritillary – Fabriciana adippe E
– patchy distribution in west England and Wales
Dark green fritillary – Speyeria aglaja NT
 S. aglaja aglaja – patchy distribution throughout, except Scotland
 S. aglaja scotica – Scotland
Silver-washed fritillary – Argynnis paphia LC
– south-western half of England and Wales; (re)expanding range east, including East Anglia

Subfamily Limenitidinae

White admiral – Limenitis camilla V
– southern England and eastern Wales

Subfamily Apaturinae
Purple emperor – Apatura iris LC
– southern England

Subfamily Nymphalinae
Red admiral – Vanessa atalanta LC

– resident and common immigrant throughout
Painted lady – Vanessa carduiLC
– immigrant throughout
Small tortoiseshell – Aglais urticae LC
– throughout
Peacock – Aglais ioLC

– throughout, except Scottish Highlands and Western Isles; expanding range throughout Scotland, including Western Isles
Comma – Polygonia c-album LC
– throughout England and Wales; expanding range northwards and spreading in southern Scotland

Marsh fritillary – Euphydryas (Eurodryas) aurinia V
– patchy distribution, mostly in west
Glanville fritillary – Melitaea cinxia E
– southern coast of Isle of Wight and Channel Islands (formerly widespread in south-east)
Heath fritillary – Melitaea athalia E
– West Country and Kent; re-introduced to Essex

Subfamily Satyrinae
Speckled wood – Pararge aegeria LC

 P. aegeria tircis – throughout southern third of Great Britain, Scottish Highlands; expanding range north and east in England and Scotland; has colonized Isle of Man 
 P. aegeria oblita – western Scotland and Inner Hebrides
 P. aegeria insula – Isles of Scilly
Wall – Lasiommata megera E
– throughout England and Wales, southern Scotland (localized); expanding north and "infilling", but declined rapidly inland in East Anglia
Small mountain ringlet – Erebia epiphron NT
 E. epiphron mnemon – Cumbria 
 E. epiphron scotica – central Scotland
Scotch argus – Erebia aethiops V
 E. aethiops aethiops – Cumbria 
 E. aethiops caledonia – Scotland
Marbled white – Melanargia galathea serena LC
– throughout south-east half of the country, including West Country, but not most of East Anglia; expanding range northwards
Grayling – Hipparchia semele E
 H. semele semele – much of English coast, inland in parts of south and East Anglia
 H. semele scota – eastern Scotland (near coast)
 H. semele thyone – Wales
 H. semele atlantica – Hebrides
Gatekeeper – Pyronia tithonus britanniae LC
– throughout southern half of country, except central Wales; expanding range northwards
Meadow brown – Maniola jurtina LC
 M. jurtina insularis – throughout (except for areas occupied by other subspecies)
 M. jurtina cassiteridum – Isles of Scilly
 M. jurtina splendida – western Scotland, including Hebrides
Ringlet – Aphantopus hyperantus LC
– throughout, except north-west England and north-west half of Scotland; expanding range in English Midlands, western England, English–Scottish borders, and Scotland; "infilling" southern Scotland
Small heath – Coenonympha pamphilus V
 C. pamphilus pamphilus – throughout, except far north and Hebrides
 C. pamphilus rhoumensis – Hebrides
Large heath – Coenonympha tullia E
 C. tullia davus – patchy distribution throughout northern and central England
 C. tullia polydama – central-west and north Wales, northern England and southern Scotland
 C. tullia scotica – rest of Scotland

Vagrant, extinct and exotic species

Extinct
Arran brown – Erebia ligea
Black-veined white – Aporia crataegi RE
Mazarine blue – Cyaniris semiargus (now vagrant only)RE
Large copper – Lycaena dispar (Great Britain subspecies extinct; continental subspecies introduced now also extinct)RE
Large tortoiseshell – Nymphalis polychloros (now vagrant only, although sightings in southern England since 2007 suggest recolonisation may be occurring)RE
Almond-eyed ringlet – Erebia alberganus

Vagrants

Pale clouded yellow – Colias hyale
Berger's clouded yellow – Colias alfacariensis 
Bath white – Pontia daplidice
Western dappled white – Euchloe crameri
Long-tailed blue – Lampides boeticus
Lang's short-tailed blue – Leptotes pirithous
Scarce swallowtail – Iphiclides podalirius
Short-tailed blue – Cupido (Everes) argiades
Geranium bronze – Cacyreus marshalli (imported on geraniums)
Scarce or yellow-legged tortoiseshell – Nymphalis xanthomelas
Camberwell beauty – Nymphalis antiopa
Map – Araschnia levana (formerly introduced and bred)
Queen of Spain fritillary – Issoria lathonia
Monarch – Danaus plexippus
Plain tiger – Danaus chrysippus (single record from Cambridgeshire, April 2011, coincident with influx of vagrant Odonata)
Apollo – Parnassius apollo
American painted lady – Vanessa virginiensis

Exotics

Species included in the Great Britain Lepidoptera numbering system, but believed never to have occurred naturally in a wild state
Fiery skipper – Hylephila phyleus
Mallow skipper – Carcharodus alceae
Oberthür's grizzled skipper – Pyrgus armoricanus
Shy saliana – Saliana longirostris
Small Apollo – Parnassius phoebus
Spanish festoon – Zerynthia rumina
Southern festoon – Zerynthia polyxena
Tiger swallowtail – Papilio glaucus
Moorland clouded yellow – Colias palaeno
Cleopatra – Gonepteryx cleopatra
Slate flash – Rapala schistacea
Scarce copper – Lycaena virgaureae
Sooty copper – Lycaena tityrus
Purple-shot copper – Lycaena alciphron
Purple-edged copper – Lycaena hippothoe
Turquoise blue – Polyommatus dorylas
Green-underside blue – Glaucopsyche alexis
Julia – Dryas julia
Albin's Hampstead eye (meadow argus) – Junonia villida
Blue pansy – Junonia oenone
Zebra – Colobura dirce
Small brown shoemaker (orange mapwing) – Hypanartia lethe
Indian red admiral – Vanessa indica
Weaver's fritillary – Boloria dia
Aphrodite fritillary – Speyeria aphrodite
Niobe fritillary – Fabriciana niobe
Cardinal or Mediterranean fritillary – Argynnis pandora
Great spangled fritillary – Speyeria cybele
Spotted fritillary – Melitaea didyma
Large wall – Lasiommata maera
Woodland grayling – Hipparchia fagi
Hermit – Chazara briseis
False grayling – Arethusana arethusa
Cassia's owl-butterfly – Opsiphanes cassiae
Illioneus giant owl – Caligo illioneus

See also

Butterfly Conservation – Britain's butterfly and moth conservation society
List of butterflies of Ireland
List of moths of Great Britain

References

butterflies
butterflies
Great Britain
°Great Britain
butterflies
'butterflies